This is a list of flag bearers who have represented Moldova at the Olympics.

Flag bearers carry the national flag of their country at the opening ceremony of the Olympic Games.

See also
Moldova at the Olympics

References

Moldova at the Olympics
Moldova
Olympic flagbearers
Olympic flagbearers